Floyd Masson (born 1 December 1991) is a New Zealand and Australian professional boxer.

Masson is currently the Australian National Cruiserweight champion and the ANBF Australasian Cruiserweight champion. He won the Australasian title in July 2021 against Joseph Liga before winning the Australian National title in December against multiple time world title challenger Mark Flanagan.

Amateur boxing 
Masson fought in 45 amateur boxing fights in his career. Although unable to pick up a New Zealand national title, after moving to Australia and joining a new gym he managed to win Australian Golden Gloves. During his amateur career, Masson moved to Perth, Western Australian and was coached under Australian coach Sean Nash.

Professional career
Masson made his professional boxing debut in 2018 against New Zealander Jordan Mororoa. Masson won the fight with his opponent retiring in the corner. This began the winning streak for Masson. After a win over Abdullad Saad Alghmadi in October 2018, Masson fought in New Zealand in November 2018 for the first time since fighting as an amateur boxer. Before the fight, Masson stated his ambitions to win the Australian title before aiming for a boxing world title. Masson took on Tuvalu born New Zealand boxer Navosa Loata on the Lucas Browne vs Junior Pati undercard. Masson won the fight by unanimous decision, however he sustained cracked ribs during the fight.

After a win over New Zealander Waikato Falefehi, Masson fought journeyman Roger Izonritei. Despite the fight being scheduled for eight rounds, Masson won the fight in the first round by knockout. In June 2019, Masson signed a co-managerial deal with MJA Platinum. In the sixth fight of his career, Masson took on Christian Ndzie Tsoye in one of the toughest fights of his career. The fight was for the promoters version of the Western Australia State cruiserweight title. Masson took Tsoye the full 8 rounds to win his first boxing title by unanimous decision. Masson finished his 2019 boxing year in October with a unanimous decision win over Indian boxer Kuldeep Singh.

Contender to National Champion 2020 - 2021
Masson had his first and only fight of 2020 in March against New Zealander and IBO Asia Pacific champion Lance Bryant. Masson won against Bryant with ease with a TKO win in the first round. Lance Bryant retired shortly after the fight. Due to the worldwide COVID-19 pandemic, Floyd Masson was not able to secure any more fights in 2020.

In February 2021, Masson announced that he would move to Brisbane, Queensland, Australia to focus on his boxing career. He started the year moving to Eastside Boxing Gym and with new promoter Angelo Di Carlo under Ace Boxing Group. For the first fight for the year and under the new promoter, Masson took on New Zealander Waikato Falefehi in a rematch in March 2021. Masson won the fight by third round stoppage. In July 2021, Masson took on Joseph Liga to fight for the first major title of his career, the vacant ANBF Australasian cruiserweight title. Masson won the fight in the 4th round by stoppage. To finish his 2021, Masson took on the biggest fight of his career, Australian Mark Flanagan in December 2021. Flanagan has fought multiple New Zealanders in the past and has fought for the world title on two separate occasions. Masson won the fight by majority decision winning the Australian national title and successfully defending his Australasian title. The fight was a close fight and has since been described as one of the best national title fights that has ever been seen. After the fight, Masson won multiple awards for the fight including International Fight of the year and Champion Of The Year under the New Zealand Boxing Awards. On 31 January 2022, it was announced that Masson won Australia's version of the boxing awards, the 2022 Everlast Aus-Boxing Awards for round of the year. The round he won the award for was against Mark Flanagan again in the 10th round.

World Rankings, IBO World title fight 2022 - Present 
Masson began his 2022 boxing year where he took on Indian boxer Vikas Singh. The fight went the distance with Masson doing well, which showed when Masson knocked down his opponent in the eighth and final round. Masson won the fight by Unanimous Decision, winning all the round on all of the judges scorecards. In April 2022, Masson started getting ranked in the WBC, receiving the ranking of 39th in the Cruiserweight division. In December 2022, Masson debut on the IBF crusierweight rankings, reaching 12th. In January 2023, it was announced that Masson would take on Italian boxer Fabio Turchi on April 1st for the vacant IBO World Crusierweight title.

Personal life 
Masson started boxing around the age of 15. Around that time, a person who helped out with training gave Masson guidance about not drinking while boxing, which was a strong influence and lead Masson to not drink Alcohol. Outside of boxing, Masson is a keen surfer, and is passionate about food.

Boxing titles 
 Boxing Australia
 Australian Golden Gloves
 Dragon Fire Boxing
 Western Australia state Cruiserweight title
 Australian National Boxing Federation
 Australasian Cruiserweight title
 Australian National Cruiserweight title

Professional boxing record

Awards 
 2021 New Zealand Boxing Awards International Fight of the year (Won)
 2021 New Zealand Boxing Awards Champion of the year (Won)
 2021 Everlast Aus-Boxing Awards Round of the year (Won)

References

External links

Living people
Cruiserweight boxers
Australian male boxers
New Zealand male boxers
1991 births
Southpaw boxers
People from Te Awamutu
Sportspeople from Waikato